Alan Cameron Watson  (16 March 1900 – 15 January 1976) was a New Zealand-Australian Presbyterian minister.

Watson was born in Feilding, New Zealand and educated at the University of Otago. He was ordained to the ministry of the Presbyterian Church of New Zealand in 1925 and served in Dunedin, East Taieri, and Christchurch. In 1942 he emigrated to Australia and became minister of Toorak Presbyterian Church in Melbourne. He served as Moderator of the Presbyterian Church of Victoria in 1953-54 and Moderator General of the Presbyterian Church of Australia from 1959 to 1962.

Watson received an honorary doctorate from Lewis and Clark College in 1954, and was made a Companion of the Order of St Michael and St George in the 1968 New Year Honours.

References

1900 births
1976 deaths
People from Feilding
University of Otago alumni
New Zealand Presbyterian ministers
Australian Presbyterian ministers
Australian Companions of the Order of St Michael and St George
New Zealand emigrants to Australia